Edoardo Lubian (Rovigo, 11 October 1990) is an Italian rugby union player.
His usual position is as a Flanker and he currently plays for Rovigo Delta in Top12.

For 2013–14 Pro12 season, he was named like Additional Player for Benetton Treviso.

In 2010, Lubian was named in the Italy Under 20 squad.

References

External links 
It's Rugby England Profile
Ultimate Rugby Profile
Eurosport Profile

Sportspeople from the Province of Rovigo
Italian rugby union players
1990 births
Living people
Rugby union flankers
People from Rovigo
Rugby Rovigo Delta players